Vincent Lardo (born 1930) is an American popular crime novelist.

Life and career

Born in the Bronx, Lardo attended the former Evander Childs High School, followed by the City College of New York.

He enlisted in the Army in 1952, and in 1953 was due to be sent to fight in the Korean War. The armistice was signed the same day he was scheduled to sail. In 1954 he was stationed in Japan, and was discharged the same year. He enrolled at Fairleigh Dickinson University in New Jersey under the G.I. Bill, gaining a degree in English literature. After pursuing a banking career, he entered public relations and advertising which became his main career until the mid-1980s when he started writing novels after learning to use a word processor.<ref name="Martin">Martin, Bob Vincent Lardo: From Gay Lit To His Very Own 'Thrones''',  The East Hampton Press & The Southampton Press, 6 April 2015 ; http://www.27east.com/news/article.cfm/Amagansett/102028/Vincent-Lardo-From-Gay-Lit-To-His-Very-Own-Thrones</ref>

In 1998, he retired and relocated from Manhattan to his second home in Amagansett with his partner, Bob Evans, who died a year later.

He has said that his first novel, a "mainstream" mystery, was rejected by publishers, until he decided to change the plot, removing the protagonist's wife, and giving him a gay son.

Following the death of popular novelist Lawrence Sanders in 1998, Lardo was offered the opportunity to continue Sanders' Archy McNally series.  Eventually six of Lardo's McNally novels reached The New York Times bestseller list.  The authorial transition was not without incident. Following publication of the first novel, class-action suits against the publisher were brought by McNally fans who contended that they had been deceived as to the new authorship: in the hardcover version Lardo's name had been printed in small type on the copyright page. Settlements by the publisher were made.Drew, Bernard A. Literary Afterlife: The Posthumous Continuations of 325 Authors' Fictional Characters, McFarlland & Company, Jefferson, North Carolina, 2010, p136

In 2013, Lardo returned to the gay/lesbian genre with The Jockstrap Murders.Selected works

 Novels 

 China House (1983)
 The Prince and the Pretender (1984)
 Mask of Narcissus (1987)
 The Hampton Affair (1999)
 Death by Drowning (2000)
 The Hampton Connection (2000)
 The Jockstrap Murders (2013)

 Archy McNally novels 

 McNally's Dilemma (1999)
 McNally's Folly (2000)
 McNally's Chance (2001)
 McNally's Alibi (2002)
 McNally's Dare (2003)
 McNally's Bluff'' (2004)

Articles 
Wilde's Company: Nineteen Cleveland St., London. 1889 in The Gay & Lesbian Review Worldwide, 1996

References

External links
 Penguin Books Bio: Vincent Lardo

Living people
1930 births
American LGBT novelists
American mystery writers
American gay writers
Writers from the Bronx
Crime novelists
20th-century American novelists
21st-century American novelists
Fairleigh Dickinson University alumni